More Myself: A Journey is a book by American recording artist Alicia Keys, written with the assistance of writer Michelle Burford. The book is the first release on Oprah Winfrey's imprint An Oprah Book. The book appeared at number three on The New York Times Best Seller list for Hardcover Nonfiction and at number four for Combined Print & E-Book Nonfiction. It also appeared at number seven on Publishers Weekly'''s list of the best selling Hardcover Frontlist Nonfiction books. In 2021, the book won the Audie Award for Best Narration by Author, while also being nominated for Best Audiobook.

 Background and release 
Keys and Oprah Winfrey announced the book on 30 March 2019 on their respective social media accounts. Described as "part autobiography, part narrative documentary", Keys expressed much excitement at the announcement of the book's release about both the book and getting to release it through her friend's (Oprah’s) imprint. The book was originally slated to be released on November 5, 2019. The audiobook version narrated by Keys, includes introductions and vignettes by Oprah Winfrey, Bono, Swizz Beatz, Jay Z and Michelle Obama, as well as original music by Keys. The memoir in combination with her album Alicia (2020) were described by Keys as "the best therapy I ever had" Keys stated that the book and album are "similar in this exploration, in the concept, in the conversation about identity, and what makes us up to be who we are".

 Promotion 
In October 2019, Keys appeared on Jimmy Kimmel Live! to promote the book and stated that ""I’m definitely looking and I’ve been on a journey to discover more of who I am and how to be more authentically who I am without kind of worrying about what other people think". In an interview with CBS News Sunday Morning in March 2020, Keys stated that journey to knowing herself has been a struggle for her, saying that "the craziest part is that I didn't know that I didn't know myself". Keys also revealed that her mother considered abortion after getting pregnant. In April 2020, Keys appeared on The Late Show with Stephen Colbert via video call to discuss the book. Keys appeared on El Hormiguero to promote the Spanish version of the book, More Myself: Mi Viaje'', on June 10, 2021.

Release history

References

2020 non-fiction books
Alicia Keys
Music autobiographies
Collaborative non-fiction books
Flatiron Books books